M. B. Goffstein (20 December 1940–20 December 20, 2017) was an American writer and illustrator of books for children and adults. She was the recipient of three New York Times Best Illustrated Children's Books of the Year (A Little Schubert, Natural History, and An Artist), Special Recognition from the Jane Addams Children's Book Award (Natural History), and a Caldecott Honor for Fish for Supper.

Biography 
Marilyn Brooke Goffstein was born in St. Paul, Minnesota on December 20, 1940, the daughter of Albert and Esther (Rosentzweig) Goffstein. She graduated from Bennington College in 1962, creating a sculpture for her senior show. Her first children's book, The Gats!, was published in 1966 with editor Michael di Capua. They worked for the next twenty years together—their last project coming in 1986 with My Editor.

In the summer of 1980, she taught with Lore Segal at the Writing Workshops at Bennington College. She also taught children's book illustration at Parsons School of Design and the University of Minnesota's Split Rock Arts summer program.

Works 

 The Gats! (1966)
 Sleepy People (1966)
 Brookie and Her Lamb (1967)
 Across the Sea (1968)
 Goldie the Dollmaker (1969)
 Two Piano Tuners (1970)
 The Underside of the Leaf (1972)
 A Little Schubert (1972)
 Me and My Captain (1974)
 The First Books (1979)
 Daisy Summerfield's Style (1975)
 Fish for Supper (1976)
 My Crazy Sister (1976)
 Family Scrapbook (1978)
 My Noah's Ark (1978)
 Natural History (1979)
 Neighbors (1979)
 An Artist (1980)
 Laughing Latkes (1980)
 Lives of the Artists (1981)
 A Writer (1984)
 An Artists Album (1985)
 My Editor (1986)
 Our Snowman (1986)
 School of Names (1986)
 Your Lone Journey (1986)
 Artists' Helpers Enjoy the Evenings (1987)
 An Actor (as Brooke Goffstein, 1987)
 Our Prairie Home: A Picture Album (as Brooke Goffstein, 1988)
 A House, a Home (as Brooke Goffstein, 1989)
 Words Alone: Twenty-Six Books Without Pictures (2018)
 Art Girls Together: Two Novels (2018)
 Daisy Summerfield's Art: The Complete Flea Market Mysteries (2019)
 Biography of Miss Go Chi: Novelettos & Poems (2019)

Further reading 
 The Underside of the Leaf : The New York Times, May 28, 1972
The Intimate World of M. B. Goffstein, The Washington Post, Maggie Stern, September 9, 1979
Porte, B.A. The picture books of M. B. Goffstein. Child Lit Educ 11, 3–9 (1980)
 An Artist and Laughing Latkes : The New York Times, January 11, 1981
 Artist Helpers Enjoy the Evening : Kirkus, June 1, 1987
 An Actor : The New York Times, November 8, 1987
Shannon, G. The artist's journey and the journey as art: M. B. Goffstein's “grains of sand”. Child Lit Educ 18, 210–218 (1987)
Bringing Them to Life: Artists, Musicians, and Authors, ALA Booklinks (1999)
M. B. Goffstein: New York Review Books
The Ongoing Journey of M.B. Goffstein's Oeuvre, Sally Lodge, Publishers Weekly, January 9, 2020
The Possibility of a Generous Frugality: Re-releasing M. B. Goffstein, Elizabeth Bird, School Library Journal, March 2, 2021

References 

20th-century American women artists
20th-century American women writers
American children's book illustrators
American children's writers
Writers from Saint Paul, Minnesota
1940 births
2017 deaths
21st-century American women